This is a page that depicts Khalistani militants and paramilitary outfits.

Khalistani militant and paramilitary outfits 

Babbar Khalsa is listed as a terrorist organisation by the United Kingdom, the EU, Canada, India, and the United States.

Others with less details

All-India Sikh Students Federation (AISSF)
Khalistan Liberation Army (KLA)
Khalistan Liberation Front (KLF)
Dashmesh Regiment
Khalistan Liberation Organisation (KLO)
Khalistan National Army (KNA)
Shaheed Khalsa Force
Khalistan Guerilla Force
Khalistan Security Force

See also 

 Khalistan movement
 Kharku

References

Bibliography

Sikh politics
Paramilitary organisations based in India
Khalistan movement
Sikh terrorism
Pro-Khalistan militant outfits